Breakers  may refer to:

Geography
 A breaking wave on water
 Breaker (reef), a shallow over which waves break

Arts and entertainment
Breakers (Stephen King), from the Dark Tower books
Breakers (TV series), an Australian television series
The Breakers (band), a Danish rock band
The Breakers (American band), a 1960s garage rock band
"Breakers" (song), a 2012 song by Local Natives
Orlando Breakers, a fictional National Football League team in Coach (TV series)
New York City Breakers, a professional pioneer Breaking and B-boy crew or group

Video games
Breakers (1986 video game), a 1986 text adventure video game by Broderbund
Breakers (1996 video game), a 1996 fighting arcade game by Visco
Dawn of the Breakers, a 2018 free-to-play action-adventure game by CyberStep

Sports

United States
Bay State Breakers, a Junior A ice hockey team in the Eastern Junior Hockey League, based in Rockland, Massachusetts
Boston Breakers (WPSL Elite), a professional soccer team in Women's Professional Soccer
Boston Breakers (WUSA) (2000-2003), a former professional soccer team in Women's United Soccer Association
Daytona Beach Breakers, a defunct ice hockey team in the Sunshine Hockey League (1992-1995) and the Southern Hockey League (1995-1996)
Long Beach Breakers (2001-2003), a defunct minor league baseball team in Long Beach, California
North Bay Breakers (1994-1995), a defunct soccer team in Santa Rosa, California
Northeast Pennsylvania Breakers, a former member of the American Basketball Association (2005) and the United States Basketball League (2006)
Orange County Breakers, a World TeamTennis franchise, named the Newport Beach Breakers from 2003 to 2011
Portland Breakers (1985), a former United States Football League team
Santa Barbara Breakers, a team in the West Coast Pro Basketball League
Santa Cruz County Breakers (2007-2008), a defunct soccer team
Seattle Breaker, former name (1977-1985) of the Seattle Thunderbirds, a Western Hockey League team
Southern California Breakers, a former team in the Independent Women's Football League based in Orange County, California

Australia and New Zealand
Newcastle Breakers FC, a defunct football club (1991-2000) of Newcastle, New South Wales
Breakers Stadium, now known as The Gardens Greyhound and Sporting Complex
New South Wales Breakers, a team in the Women's National Cricket League
New Zealand Breakers, a team in the Australian National Basketball League
Queensland Breakers, a club water polo team

Canada
British Columbia Breakers, an ice hockey team in the National Women's Hockey League
Cape Breton Breakers (1993-1994), a defunct National Basketball League team

Buildings 
Breakers Hotel, Palm Beach, Florida
Breakers Hotel (Long Beach, California)
Hotel Breakers, Sandusky, Ohio
The Breakers, a mansion in Newport, Rhode Island
The Breakers (1878), the original estate at that site

See also 
Breaker (disambiguation)